The Big Five Hlabisa Local Municipality council consists of twenty-seven members elected by mixed-member proportional representation. Fourteen councillors are elected by first-past-the-post voting in fourteen wards, while the remaining thirteen are chosen from party lists so that the total number of party representatives is proportional to the number of votes received.

It was established for the August 2016 local elections by the merging of The Big 5 False Bay and Hlabisa local municipalities.

In the election of 3 August 2016 the Inkatha Freedom Party (IFP) won a majority of thirteen seats on the council. In 2021 the IFP won an increased majority of fifteen.

Results 
The following table shows the composition of the council and its predecessors after past elections.

The Big Five False Bay

Hlabisa

Big Five Hlabisa

December 2000 election

The following table shows the results of the 2000 election.

The Big Five False Bay

Hlabisa

March 2006 election

The following table shows the results of the 2006 election.

The Big Five False Bay

Hlabisa

May 2011 election

The following table shows the results of the 2011 election.

The Big Five False Bay

Hlabisa
In 2011 a substantial part of the Hlabisa municipality's land area, including more than half of its population, was transferred to the Mtubatuba Local Municipality. Consequently the council was reduced from 37 seats to 16 seats.

August 2016 election

The Big Five False Bay and Hlabisa municipalities were merged at the time of the 2016 election. The following table shows the results of the election.

November 2021 election

The following table shows the results of the 2021 election.

References

Big Five Hlabisa
Elections in KwaZulu-Natal
Umkhanyakude District Municipality